An underwater tunnel is a tunnel which is partly or wholly constructed under the sea or a river. They are often used where building a bridge or operating a ferry link is unviable, or to provide competition or relief for existing bridges or ferry links. While short tunnels are often road tunnels which may admit motorized traffic, unmotorized traffic or both, concerns with ventilation lead to the longest tunnels (such as the Channel Tunnel or the Seikan Tunnel) being electrified rail tunnels.

Types of tunnel 
Various methods are used to construct underwater tunnels, including an immersed tube and a submerged floating tunnel. The immersed tube method involves steel tube segments that are positioned in a trench in the sea floor and joined together. The trench is then covered and the water pumped from the tunnel. Submerged floating tunnels use the law of buoyancy to remain submerged, with the tunnel attached to the sea bed by columns or tethers, or hung from pontoons on the surface.

Advantages

Compared with bridges 

One such advantage would be that a tunnel would still allow shipping to pass. A low bridge would need an opening or swing bridge to allow shipping to pass, which can cause traffic congestion. Conversely, a higher bridge that does allow shipping may be unsightly and opposed by the public. Higher bridges can also be more expensive than lower ones. Bridges can also be closed due to harsh weather such as high winds.

Tunneling makes excavated soil available that can be used to create new land (see land reclamation). This was done with the rock excavated for the Channel Tunnel, which was used to create Samphire Hoe.

Compared with ferry links 

As with bridges, albeit with more chance, ferry links will also be closed during adverse weather. Strong winds or the tidal limits may also affect the workings of a ferry crossing. Travelling through a tunnel is significantly quicker than travelling using a ferry link, shown by the times for travelling through the Channel Tunnel (75–90 minutes for Ferry and 21 minutes on the Eurostar). Ferries offer much lower frequency and capacity and travel times tend to be longer with a ferry than a tunnel. Ferries also usually use fossil fuels emitting greenhouse gases in the process while most railway tunnels are electrified. In the Baltic Sea, one of the busiest areas for passenger ferries in the world, sea ice is a problem, causing seasonal disruption or requiring expensive ice-breaking ships. In the Øresund region the construction of the bridge-tunnel has been cited as enhancing regional integration and giving an economic boom not possible with the previous ferry links. Similar arguments are used by proponents of the Helsinki-Tallinn tunnel in the Talsinki region. There are various issues with the safety of both tunnels and ferries, in the case of tunnels, fire is a particular hazard with several fires having broken out in the Channel Tunnel. On the other hand, the free surface effect is a significant safety risk for RORO ferries as seen in the sinking of MS Estonia. Tunnels which exclude dangerous, combustible freights and the fuel carried aboard motorcars can significantly reduce fire risk.

Disadvantages

Compared with bridges 

Tunnels require far higher costs of security and construction than bridges. This may mean that over short distances bridges may be preferred rather than tunnels (for example Dartford Crossing). As stated earlier, bridges may not allow shipping to pass, so solutions such as the Øresund Bridge have been constructed.

Compared with ferry links 

As with bridges, ferry links are far cheaper to construct than tunnels, but not to operate. Also tunnels don't have the flexibility to be deployed over different routes as transport demand changes over time. Without the cost of a new ferry, the route over which a ferry provides transport can easily be changed. However, this flexibility can be a downside for customers who have come to rely on the ferry service only to see it abandoned. Fixed infrastructure such as bridges or tunnels represent a much more concrete commitment to sustained service.

List of notable examples

Proposed

Road 
 Rogfast tunnel in Norway – construction having started in 2018, at 27 km length, 392 m depth, it will be the longest road tunnel and deepest undersea tunnel in the world.
Underwater Road Tunnel Salamina island-Perama - planned road tunnel in Attica, Greece. Currently at the second stage of the tender from which the concessionaire will be selected.
 India-Sri Lanka Sea Tunnel (proposed) 
 Penang Undersea Tunnel in Malaysia – to be opened in 2025

Rail 
 Bohai Strait tunnel in China between Dalian and Yantai (decided, construction to start 'as soon as possible'.)
 Helsinki to Tallinn Tunnel under the Gulf of Finland (proposed)
 Irish Sea Tunnel (suggested)
 Rio de Janeiro Metro Bay Tunnel (Line 3 – Rio de Janeiro-Niterói) (proposed)
 Fehmarn Belt Fixed Link between Denmark and Germany (decided, construction started in January 2021)
 Mumbai–Ahmedabad high-speed rail corridor of India (decided, construction start November 2018)
 India-Sri Lanka Sea Tunnel (proposed) 
 Taiwan Strait Tunnel - if built would become the longest rail tunnel in the world engineering challenges and the unsolved political status of Taiwan make construction unlikely
 Strait of Gibraltar Tunnel - linking Gibraltar or the Spanish mainland to the African mainland. If built it would most likely become the deepest tunnel ever built

See also 
 Immersed tube tunnel
 Intercontinental and transoceanic fixed links
 Shark tunnel

References 

Coastal construction